Jimi may refer to:
 Jimi language (Cameroon)
 Jimi language (Nigeria)
 Jimi languages
 Jimi system, the administration system of ancient China
 Jimi River, in Papua New Guinea
 Jimi Valley, in Papua New Guinea
 Jimi District, in Papua New Guinea
 Jimi Rural LLG, in Papua New Guinea
 "Jimi", a song by The Beastie Boys from their 1994 album Some Old Bullshit
 A waist-cloth traditionally worn by Bharwad women in India

People with the name
Jimi Cauty (born 1956), British musician
Jimi Hendrix (1942–1970), American guitarist
Jimi Heselden (1948–2010), British entrepreneur
Jimi Jamison (1951–2014), songwriter and singer of the band Survivor
Jimi Lewis (born 1974), English field hockey player
Jimi Shields (born 1967), Irish musician
Jimi Tunnell, American musician

See also
 James (name)
 Jimmi
 Jimmie
 Jimmy (disambiguation)